Kiyokawa  may refer to:

Places
Kiyokawa, Kanagawa, a village in Kanagawa Prefecture, Japan
Kiyokawa, Ōita, a former village in Ōno District, Ōita Prefecture, Japan
Kiyokawa Station, a railway station in Shōnai, Yamagata Prefecture, Japan

Other uses
Kiyokawa (surname), a Japanese surname